Mary Jane Nealon is an American poet, and registered nurse.

Life
She was raised in Jersey City, New Jersey.
She received her MFA from Warren Wilson College in Asheville, North Carolina. 
From 1976, she worked as a nurse in New Jersey and New York City. After Sept. 11, 2001, she studied the effects of trauma.

She was published in Forklift, Ohio, Mid American review, The Paris Review, The Kenyon Review, and ''Poets Against the War.

She currently works with people with HIV/AIDS at Partnership Health Center, Missoula, Montana, where she lives.

Awards
 1995-1996, 1996-1997 fellowships from The Fine Arts Work Center in Provincetown
 awards from the New Jersey State Council on the Arts, the Mid-Atlantic Arts Foundation
 Lucille Medwick Memorial Award of the Poetry Society of America in 2001.
 2004-2005 Amy Lowell Poetry Travelling Scholarship

Works
"Her Father Must Be a Skywriter", poets.org

Books

Anthology

Nursing

References

Warren Wilson College alumni
Writers from Jersey City, New Jersey
Living people
American nurses
American women nurses
American women poets
Year of birth missing (living people)